Nazeer Sankranthi is an Indian actor of Malayalam Cinema as well as Malayalam television shows. He rose to prominence with his humorous act of Thatteem Mutteem, a popular soap opera on Mazhavil Manorama. Naseer is also a two time winner of Kerala State Television award for the best comedian and has played notable roles in several films like The Priest, Swarna Kaduva and Kappela.

Filmography 

All films are in Malayalam language unless otherwise noted.

Television

Awards

References

External links 

Male actors from Kerala
Living people
Kerala State Television Award winners
Male actors in Malayalam cinema
Indian male film actors
21st-century Indian male actors
Malayalam comedians
Indian male comedians
Male actors in Malayalam television
Indian male television actors
Year of birth missing (living people)